The political editor of a newspaper or broadcaster is the senior political reporter who covers politics and related matters for the newspaper or station. They may have a large team of political correspondents working under them.

In publishing, because of their seniority, a political editor's byline is often added to stories which actually are the work of more junior colleagues to give the story more credibility and to indicate their seniority within the publication. The political editor usually carries out the major interviews with a country's prime minister and senior government figures and covers major events like party conferences.

United Kingdom

Broadcast journalism

BBC News
BBC News introduced the role of political editor in 1970. In addition to the nation-wide political editors, Glenn Campbell has been political editor for BBC Scotland since 2021, Felicity Evans has been political editor for BBC Cymru Wales since 2018 and Nicholas Watt has been political editor for Newsnight since 2016.

ITV News
ITN produces news programmes for ITV, Channel 4 and Channel 5. The ITN brand was used on ITV until 1999, when it was rebranded as ITV News.

Additionally, Bernard Ponsonby has been the political editor for STV News in Scotland since 2000, when he replaced Fiona Ross.

Channel 4 News
Political editors for Channel 4 News include:
 Elinor Goodman, 1988–2005
 Gary Gibbon, 2005–present (also political correspondent 1994–2005)

5 News
ITN produced the 5 News programme for Channel 5 from the channel's launch in 1997 until 2005 and again from 2012, with Sky News providing news coverage in the intervening years. Andy Bell has been the programme's political editor since 1999.

Sky News
Sky News launched in 1989 with Adam Boulton as political editor. Faisal Islam took over the role in 2014 before moving to the BBC as Economics Editor in 2019. Islam was replaced as Sky's political editor by his former deputy, Beth Rigby.

Print journalism

The Guardian

The Sun

The Sunday Times

Rest of the world

New Zealand
 Patrick Gower (Newshub) - 2012–2018

United States
 Brooke Brower (CNN) - 2017-present
 Patrick Healy (New York Times) - 2018-present
 Chris Stirewalt (Fox News) - 2010-present
 Peter Wallsten (Washington Post) - 2013-present

References

Journalism occupations
Types of editors